A Retrospective is a compilation album composed of the entire recorded output of screamo band Saetia, released October 1, 2001 by Level Plane. The album, which also includes five live recordings taken from one of the last shows the band performed at ABC No Rio, was remastered entirely by Alan Douches.

Track listing

Personnel
Billy Werner - vocals
Jamie Behar - guitar
Adam Marino - guitar (tracks 1-9, 13-17)
Colin Bartoldus - bass (tracks 1-9) guitar (tracks 10-12)
Alex Madara - bass (tracks 13-17)
Steve Roche - bass (tracks 10-12)
Greg Drudy - drums
Adam Schwartz - photography

References

External links 

Saetia albums
2001 compilation albums
Level Plane Records compilation albums